Osechka Peak is a small peak, 1,740 m, standing 6 nautical miles (11 km) south of Vorposten Peak in Lomonosov Mountains, Queen Maud Land. Mapped from air photos and surveys by Norwegian Antarctic Expedition, 1958–59; remapped by Soviet Antarctic Expedition, 1960–61, and named Gora Osechka (misfire mountain).

Mountains of Queen Maud Land
Princess Astrid Coast